Vitex acunae is a species of plant in the family Lamiaceae. It is endemic to Cuba.  It is threatened by habitat loss.

References

Endemic flora of Cuba
acunae
Vulnerable plants
Taxonomy articles created by Polbot